Henry Peronneau (1700–1754), born in Charleston, South Carolina, was a businessman in rice plantations and wine importing.  He is thought to have been the wealthiest man in America at one point.

18th-century American businesspeople
1700 births
1754 deaths